Kym Russell (born 11 April 1968) is a former Australian rules footballer who played with Collingwood in the Australian Football League (AFL).

Russell came to Collingwood from Sturt, with the 98th selection of the 1989 VFL Draft. He broke into the senior side for the first time midway through the 1991 AFL season and made three appearances for the reigning premiers. His younger brother, Scott Russell, was a teammate in each of those games.

Back in South Australia, Russell went on to play a total of 170 SANFL matches, 130 with Sturt and the other 40 for Norwood.

He was CEO of West Adelaide from 2009 to 2013.

References

External links
 

1968 births
Australian rules footballers from South Australia
Collingwood Football Club players
Sturt Football Club players
Norwood Football Club players
West Adelaide Football Club administrators
Living people